Crown Prince Munhyo (Hangul: 문효세자, Hanja: 文孝世子; 13 October 1782 – 6 June 1786), personal name Yi Sun (Hangul: 이순, Hanja: 李㬀), was the first son of Jeongjo of Joseon and his favorite concubine, Royal Noble Consort Ui of the Changnyeong Seong clan. He was the older half-brother of King Sunjo.

Family
 Father: Yi San, King Jeongjo (정조 이산) (28 October 1752 – 18 August 1800)
 Biological grandfather: Jangjo of Joseon (조선 장조) (13 February 1735 – 12 July 1762)
 Adoptive grandfather: Jinjong of Joseon (조선 진종) (April 4, 1719 – December 16, 1728)
 Biological grandmother: Queen Heongyeong of the Pungsan Hong clan (헌경왕후 홍씨) (6 August 1735 – 13 January 1816)
 Adoptive grandmother: Queen Hyosun of the Pungyang Jo clan (효순왕후 조씨) (8 January 1716 – 30 December 1751)
 Biological mother: Royal Noble Consort Ui of the Changnyeong Seong clan (의빈 성씨) (6 August 1753 – 4 November 1786)
 Grandfather: Seong Yun-u (성윤우) (1709 – 1769)
 Grandmother: Lady Im of the Buan Im clan (부인 임씨) (1722 – 1756)
 Adoptive mother: Queen Hyoui of the Cheongpung Kim clan (효의왕후 김씨) (5 January 1754 – 10 April 1821)

In popular culture

 Portrayed by Cha Jae-dol in the 2007 MBC TV series Lee San, Wind of the Palace.
 Portrayed by Park Da-on in the 2021 MBC TV series The Red Sleeve.

References

External links
자유게시판 - 예천군
문효세자(文孝世子) 보양청계병(輔養廳契屛) | 큐레이터 추천 소장품

1782 births
1786 deaths
House of Yi
Royalty and nobility who died as children
Heirs apparent who never acceded